Galium cometerhizon is a species of plants in the Rubiaceae. It is native to the Pyrenees of Spain and France, and the Island of Corsica in the Mediterranean.

Galium cometerhizon  is a low-growing, mat-forming herb with succulent leaves and white flowers.

References

External links
Flora Vascular
Flora de Aragón
Flora, Biodiversidad Virtual
Flora Silvestre de la Mediterranea

cometerhizon
Plants described in 1818
Flora of Spain
Flora of Corsica
Flora of France
Flora of the Pyrenees